Music of the Spheres is the 24th album by English musician Mike Oldfield, released in the United Kingdom on 17 March 2008. The album, Oldfield's second album with Mercury Records and his first classical work, is based on the concept of a celestial Musica universalis.

The album features New Zealand soprano Hayley Westenra (on "On My Heart") and Chinese pianist Lang Lang on six tracks.

Music of the Spheres was nominated for a Classical Brit Award in 2009.

History 
In an interview on BBC Radio 2's Steve Wright show, broadcast 23 February 2006, Oldfield elaborated on his next project, saying he was working on a long instrumental – probably in three parts and without any drum loops. He also mentioned the possibility of a tour. In an interview for the March 2007 issue of Resolution Magazine, Oldfield added that it would be a classical album "going to be based around the festival of Hallowe’en, rather than the Hollywood horror film", in which he would only play "classical guitar and grand piano". In an interview with This is London, Oldfield revealed the name of the new album as Music of the Spheres.

Recording 
Initially the album was written with electronic elements, like his last album, Light & Shade, but as the album developed it became an orchestral piece. The single "Spheres" is from the early stages of the album. Oldfield wrote much of the music in the music notation software Sibelius on an Apple Macintosh. Oldfield noted in the computing magazine MacFormat that creating the orchestral score for the album was time consuming, as the MIDI timing and velocities varied too much.

On the ITV This Morning show, while promoting his autobiography, Changeling, Oldfield stated that he would be recording the album with Karl Jenkins and a full orchestra at Abbey Road Studios in early June 2007; nine months before the final release date. In an interview with British radio station Classic FM on 10 August 2007, Oldfield noted that Lang Lang had recorded his piano pieces over a webcam from Legacy Recording Studios, New York City using iChat and a Steinway piano.

Release 
The album had been delayed a number of times, for various reasons. Originally, the release was aimed for Halloween; this was later pushed back to November 2007. In September 2007, Oldfield and Universal decided to delay the release of the album until January 2008, for personal reasons. However, in November the release date was again put back until March 2008, around this time Oldfield also moved out of the United Kingdom to Spain. It was also going to be the first classical recording released on a USB flash drive, but ultimately it was only made available on CD and Online. On iTunes the album has bonus material and there was also a promotion at HMV.co.uk; a competition with a prize of the full annotated orchestral score used during the recordings. 200 randomly selected copies from Play.com were also signed by Mike Oldfield. A 2 CD Limited Edition version including both the studio and live recordings was released on 24 November 2008.

On 18 September 2007, Universal, the record label, held a presentation event, hosted by Yellow Lounge at the Tape Club in Berlin; Oldfield was not scheduled to be present, but he appeared for 5 minutes to answer questions. There was also a promotional release, packaged in a tin. It includes a heat sensitive mug mat, shaped insert brochure, and an Electronic Press Kit disc featuring 2 video clips.

In November 2007 Universal included "On My Heart" (featuring Hayley Westenra) on their No 1 Classical Album 2008 compilation album. Westenra and Oldfield performed "On My Heart" live on the ITV daytime program The Alan Titchmarsh Show on 18 March 2008. During the week beginning the 10 March, Music of the Spheres was the featured album on the Classic FM radio station.

Live at Bilbao 
A second press event was scheduled at the Guggenheim Museum in Bilbao on 7 March 2008; as part of the launch event Oldfield performed music from Music of the Spheres live with the Euskadiko Orkestra Sinfonikoa, the Bilbao Choral Society and Hayley Westenra. The concert was recorded and was originally released exclusively on Apple's iTunes on the same day as the album, with modified artwork, EPK videos and a PDF booklet. A 2 CD version of the album was released on 24 November 2008 in a digipack.

Critical reception 
Music of the Spheres was nominated for a Classical BRIT award, the NS&I Best Album of 2009, but lost out to Royal Scots Dragoon Guards' Spirit of the Glen–Journey.

Chart performance 
Music of the Spheres entered the UK Classical charts at number 1, as published by Music Week. It also entered the UK Albums Chart at number 9, making it the most successful Oldfield album of the 2000s. Also, according to Music Week, as of October, Music of the Spheres is the 2nd best selling classical album of 2008.

Music of the Spheres is certificated Silver in UK.

Charts

Certifications

Track listing

Standard studio version

Live from Bilbao

iTunes-only version 

The iTunes-only version includes Music of the Spheres, Music of the Spheres – Live from Bilbao and Interviews.

"Spheres" 
"Spheres" is a digital-only single which was released on 3 March 2008. It is a piece from the conception stages of the album and contains parts of "Harbinger" and "Shabda". Although "Spheres" was the digital single released alongside the album, the vocal piece "On My Heart" was played in promotion of the album, such as on television show performances.

Track meanings 
One of the album's tracks is entitled "Musica Universalis", which when loosely translated into English is music of the spheres, an ancient philosophical concept that regards proportions in the movements of celestial bodies as a form of music; the concept of which the album is based upon. It is also, when literally translated, the name of Oldfield's current record label, Universal Music. This record company name trick is a repeat of a track title on his previous album Light & Shade: "Quicksilver", which is another name for the metal mercury; Light & Shade was released on Mercury Records, a sublabel of Universal Music.

Personnel 
 Mike Oldfield – Classical guitar, producer and mixer
 Hayley Westenra – vocals
 Lang Lang – piano on tracks 1, 2, 3, 5, 6 and 9.
 Karl Jenkins – orchestrations, conductor and producer
 Sinfonia Sfera Orchestra

Orchestra 
The Sinfonia Sfera Orchestra are:

 Choir:
 Mary Carewe
 Jacqueline Barron
 Nicole Tibbels
 Mae McKenna
 Heather Cairncross
 Sarah Eyden
 1st Violins:
 Richard Studt (leader)
 Judith Temppleman
 Tom Pigott-Smith
 Harriott McKenzie
 Tristan Gurney
 Jemma McCrisken
 Amy Cardigan
 Joanna McWeeney
 Gillon Cameron
 Louisa Adridge
 Kotono Sato
 Jeremy Morris
 Miriam Teppich
 Vladimir Naumov
 2nd Violins:
 Peter Camble-Kelly
 Emma Parker
 Sophie Appleton
 Jenny Chang
 Holly Maleham
 David Lyon
 Nicholas Levy
 Joanna Watts
 Lucy Hartley
 Jo West
 Sarah Carter
 Elizabeth Neil

 Violas:
 John Thorn
 Rachel Robson
 Edward Vanderspar
 Emma Owens
 Vincent Green
 Olly Burton
 Rachel Dyker
 Sarah Chapman
 Fay Sweet
 Holly Butler
 Cellos:
 Sally Pendlebury
 Jonny Byers
 Chris Worsey
 Verity Harding
 Chris Fish
 Lucy Payne
 Morwenna Del Mar
 Ben Trigg
 Basses:
 Sian Hicks
 Hugh Sparrow
 Jeremy Watt
 Kylie Davis
 Frances Casey
 Ben Griffiths
 Flutes:
 Gareth Davies
 Juliette Bausor
 Oboes:
 Roy Carter
 Rosie Jenkins

 Clarinets:
 Chris Richards
 Nick Ellis
 Bassoon:
 Steven Reay
 Louise Chapman
 Horns:
 Peter Francomb
 Dave Tollington
 Joe Walters
 Evgeny Chebykin
 Trumpets:
 Gareth Small
 Edward Pascal
 Tom Watson
 Trombone:
 Simon Willis
 James Adams
 Bass Trombone:
 Rob Collinson
 Tuba:
 Alex Kidston
 Timpani:
 Steve Henderson
 Percussion:
 Gary Kettel
 Paul Clarvis
 Sam Walton
 Neil Percy

Additional personnel 
 Miles Showell – Mastering at Metropolis Mastering, London
 Simon Rhodes – Engineer
 Rupert Christie – Assistant Producer
 Richard King – Engineer

Uses of the piece 
Australia's Seven Network television station used sections from the album ("Prophecy" and "On My Heart" (Reprise)) as backing music for a salute to Michael Phelps' 8 medals in the 2008 Summer Olympics in Beijing, China. They also played "Harbinger" behind the salute to a Japanese equestrian participant, who competed in the Olympic Games 44 years previously.

The album was used as background music in BBC Two's Ray Mears' Northern Wilderness programme in 2009.

Sections from Music of the Spheres have been used as backing music for Russell Ducker's Epimitheus, a 20-minute ballet piece. Corella Ballet Castilla y Leon premiered the work in 2009 in Spain, and they performed it in New York in March 2010.

Release history 
  – 14 March 2008
  – 17 March 2008
  – 25 March 2008
  – 24 November 2008 (2 CD edition)

References

External links 
 Mike Oldfield Discography – Music of the Spheres at Tubular.net

Mike Oldfield albums
2008 albums
Mercury Records albums
Classical crossover albums
Universal Classics and Jazz albums